José Pereira (June 8, 1927 – May 20, 2001) was a Puerto Rican pitcher in the Negro leagues.

A native of Fajardo, Puerto Rico, Pereira played for the Baltimore Elite Giants in 1947. He died in Toa Alta, Puerto Rico in 2001 at age 73.

References

External links
 and Seamheads
 Jose Pereira at Negro League Baseball Players Association

1927 births
2001 deaths
Baltimore Elite Giants players
Baseball pitchers
Puerto Rican baseball players
People from Fajardo, Puerto Rico